Russ Hauser is an American physiologist currently the Frederick Lee Hisaw Professor of Reproductive Physiology at Harvard T.H. Chan School of Public Health.  He holds Sc.D.(1994) and M.P.H. (1990) degrees from the Harvard School of Public Health.  He graduated with a M.D. from Albert Einstein College of Medicine in 1985.

References

Year of birth missing (living people)
Living people
Harvard School of Public Health faculty
American physiologists
Harvard School of Public Health alumni
Albert Einstein College of Medicine alumni